Forget Me Not Farm (also styled as Forget-Me-Not Farm) is a BBC children's television series that was originally aired on BBC1 from 13 November 1990 to 18 February 1991. Set on the eponymous Forget Me Not Farm, the show featured a scarecrow who was played by the show's creator Mike Amatt, a pair of crows named Dandelion and Burdock, a tractor named Trundle, a pig named Portly, a cow named Gracie, a sheep named Merthyr, a tanker named Topper, an unnamed non-speaking hat wearing horse and a non-speaking mouse named Mrs. Mouse.

Voice Cast 
 Anna Carteret as Trundle, Gracie and Merthyr
 Bob Peck as Dandelion and Burdock, Portly and Topper

Origins 
Mike Amatt first came up with the concept of the series when he made a simple tractor using LEGO, using remote control technology to give it lip-sync and eye movement and calling it "Max Tractor". His next goal was to create an environment for the tractor, and this led to him introducing the character of Scarecrow (with the two crows, Dandelion and Burdock, perching on his arms). He eventually persuaded Edward Pugh, the then-head of children's programmes at BBC North, to make a pilot programme. Celia Bonner, who produced and directed the series, later became involved in its live touring stage show, while the animation was done by Lyndon Evans Graphics. The scripts and songs were written and produced by Amatt himself (as was the incidental music), and the songs were also performed by him (as Scarecrow).

Episodes 
The first six episodes were originally broadcast on BBC1 as part of the Children's BBC strand on Tuesdays at 3.50 pm, but after a two-week break for Christmas and New Year, the seven remaining episodes were broadcast on Mondays instead in the same time slot.

International airing
Forget Me Not Farm has also been shown a number of times in Australia on ABC. It first aired on 11 June 1992 in the afternoons at 4:45pm after TUGS, the sister series of the long running children's television series Thomas The Tank Engine & Friends and then at 10:15am during the summer and school holidays from 30 December 1993 to 17 January 1994 and 1 to 15 July and 9 to 27 December 1996. The series has also aired on Premiere 12 in Singapore, ATV World in Hong Kong, BBC Entertainment in various countries such as Malta, Cyprus, the Netherlands, Turkey, Belgium, Portugal, France and Thailand and BFBS and SSVC Television in a variety of countries such as Germany, Cyprus and the Falkland Islands.

References

External links 
Forget Me Not Farm at the Internet Movie Database

1990 British television series debuts
1991 British television series endings
1990s British children's television series
BBC children's television shows
English-language television shows
British television shows featuring puppetry
British television series with live action and animation